Pangue Hydroelectric Plant  is a hydroelectric power station in Bío Bío Region, Chile. It lies west of Callaqui volcano at the confluence of the rivers Pangue and Huiri-Huiri. The plant uses water from the upper Bío Bío River and produces  of electricity. The plant was built by Endesa in 1996.

Technical features 
Pangue contributes 10% of the electricity fed into the Chilean integrated grid, making it the third largest power station after Ralco and Pehuenche. The dam is made of roller-compacted concrete, using about a million cubic meter of concrete. The dam and power plant were built from 1993 to 1996. This makes it one of the most efficient large hydropower plants in the world, as measured by the relation between electricity production and area flooded. The construction of Pangue, just as the one of Ralco, generated controversies between environmentalists, the Government and the private power company Endesa, because the dam impacted the indigenous Pehuenche people, whitewater rafting areas and the rights of farmers further downstream.

Controversy over water rights 
During the construction of the dam, the Appellate Court of Concepcion halted construction arguing that the filling of the reservoir and the dam’s operation unduly affected the water rights of farmers further downstream. However, the Chilean Supreme Court overruled the lower court and decided that  the nonconsumptive water rights of Endesa took precedence over the consumptive water rights of irrigators. One U.S. scholar said that the decision relied on a government report that itself was “hard to interpret as anything other than a response to political pressure from higher levels of government”, that the decision was “seriously flawed”, made “on the basis of legal reasoning of dubious quality” and that the decision constituted “a major transfer of wealth from irrigators to electric companies”.

References

Energy infrastructure completed in 1996
Energy infrastructure in Biobío Region
Hydroelectric power stations in Chile
Roller-compacted concrete dams